Lauren Pritchard (born December 27, 1987), known professionally as Lolo (stylized as LOLO), is an American singer, songwriter and actress, best known for being featured on the single "Miss Jackson" by Panic! at the Disco and her singles "Not The Drinking", "Not Gonna Let You Walk Away" and "Shine". In 2016, she released her second album In Loving Memory of When I Gave a Shit. Pritchard mentions Billy Joel, Joni Mitchell, Al Green and Candi Staton as some of the influences behind her music.

Life and career
Born and raised in Jackson, Tennessee, Pritchard began writing songs when she was 14 years old. She then moved to Los Angeles at 16, where she lived with Lisa Marie Presley and tried to make it as a singer in a reggae band. She eventually succeeded as a musical actress, by originating and playing the role of the 15-year-old runaway "Ilse" in the hit Broadway show Spring Awakening for two years.

Pritchard later settled in the United Kingdom (UK) and signed with Universal/Island Records. In August 2010, she released the single "Painkillers", and the song was also released in a remix with rapper Talib Kweli. Her debut album, Wasted in Jackson, written and produced with Eg White, was digitally released on October 25, 2010, and debuted at No. 84 in the UK. It was also scheduled for physical release in the United States on February 22, 2011.

In 2013, Pritchard adopted the stage name Lolo and has since signed with DCD2 Records. "Under her given name, Pritchard was also the composer-lyricist of the new musical Songbird..." She was also featured on the Panic! at the Disco song, "Miss Jackson" and later re-created a sample of "Tom's Diner" by Susanne Vega for American Rock band Fall Out Boy's single "Centuries" in 2014.

In September 2016, LOLO released the full-length album In Loving Memory of When I Gave A Shit.. The album was produced by Jake Sinclair and was released by Atlantic Records to mostly positive reviews

On November 7, 2017, Pritchard's debut feature film (Romance) In the Digital Age was released by Comedy Dynamics.  The film starred Pritchard as "Ellis Tillman," an ex-emo star turned med-student and was written and directed by Jason Michael Brescia. Pritchard also composed the song "(Romance) In The Digital Age" for the film.

In 2019, Pritchard was made a member of the Off-Broadway Animus Theatre Company in NYC.

Discography

Albums
Wasted in Jackson (2010) 
In Loving Memory of When I Gave a Shit (2016)
X (2021)
lauren (2022)

Extended plays
Comeback Queen EP (2015)

Singles
 "When the Night Kills the Day" (2010) 
 "Painkillers" (2010) 
 "Not the Drinking" (2010) 
 "Stuck" (2011) 
 "Weapon for Saturday" (2013)
 "Heard It from a Friend" (2013)
 "Year Round Summer of Love" (2013)
 "Gangsters" (2014)
 "Hit and Run" (2014)
 "I Don't Wanna Have to Lie" (2015)
 "Shine" (2016)
 "Not Gonna Let You Walk Away" (2016)

Promotional singles 
 "The Devil's Gone to Dinner" (2016)
 "The Courtyard" (2016)
 "Heard It from a Friend" (2016)

Features 
"Miss Jackson" (2013) – Panic! at the Disco
"Headphones" (2014) – Matt Nathanson
"WAIT" (2014) – Lemaitre
"Centuries" (2014) – Fall Out Boy [Uncredited]
"Cure Me" (2014) – Redlight
"Boomerang" (2014) – Joey Contreras

Other Releases 
 "Not Gonna Let You Walk Away (Tennessee Mix)" (2016)

References

External links

 

1987 births
21st-century American actresses
21st-century American singers
Actresses from Tennessee
American women singer-songwriters
Island Records artists
Living people
Singer-songwriters from Tennessee
People from Jackson, Tennessee
21st-century American women singers
Alternative rock singers
American women pop singers
American funk singers
American soul singers